The Chiwapa Formation is a geologic formation in Mississippi. It preserves fossils dating back to the Cretaceous period.

See also
 List of fossiliferous stratigraphic units in Mississippi
 Paleontology in Mississippi

References

 

Cretaceous Mississippi